Ståle Økland (born 21 April 1976) is a Norwegian writer, thinker, trend expert and public speaker. He grew up in Bryne, Leverkusen and Paris. He currently lives in Oslo, Norway.

Personal life
Ståle Økland's academic background is studies in sociology, history and German language. He started his career in the advertising industry as a copywriter with an advertising company in Stavanger, Norway. He shortly became a creative director in the agency, and later partner and managing director. In 2007 he founded a Norwegian trend agency called Domene Fem AS.

Works
Økland  discusses issues relating to the fields of consumption, technology, trade and society, and current topics of relevance to the business community such as globalization, social and cultural change, innovation, strategic management and retail trends. He has given keynote speeches at many European conferences.

Ståle Økland has also had a political career, among others as vice-mayor in the municipality of Time, Norway (2003-2005).  He is the eldest son of the former Norwegian footballer Arne Larsen Økland.

Publications 
 Datakrasj (2015)
 Bykamp (2014), together with Nicolai Strøm Olsen. 
 Tenk som en rockestjerne (2013)  
  Trendmania (2011) Trendmania

References

External links
 Athenas Deutschland
 Athenas Schweiz
 Referenten:Guillot

1976 births
Living people
Norwegian writers
People from Bryne